The Ilfeld Warehouse, on Main St. in Magdalena, New Mexico, was built in 1913.  It was listed on the National Register of Historic Places in 1982.

It is a two-story red brick building upon a stone foundation, with a stepped parapet on its street side.  It originally had a railroad siding adjacent.

It is located at 200 N. Main St.

References

		
National Register of Historic Places in Socorro County, New Mexico
Mission Revival architecture in New Mexico
Buildings and structures completed in 1913